George Vernon Hudson FRSNZ (20 April 1867 – 5 April 1946) was a British-born New Zealand entomologist credited with proposing the modern daylight saving time. He was awarded the Hector Memorial Medal in 1923.

Biography
Born in London, Britain, on Easter Saturday, 1867 Hudson was the sixth child of Emily Jane Carnal and Charles Hudson, an artist and stained-glass window designer.  By the age of 14 he had built up a collection of British insects, and had published a paper in The Entomologist. In 1881 Hudson moved with his father to Nelson, New Zealand. He worked on a farm, and in 1883, aged 16, he began working at the post office in Wellington, where he eventually became chief clerk, retiring in 1918.

Hudson was a member of the 1907 Sub-Antarctic Islands Scientific Expedition. Its main aim was to extend the magnetic survey of New Zealand by investigating the Auckland and Campbell islands but botanical, biological, and zoological surveys were also conducted. The expedition also rescued castaways from the Dundonald, which had been shipwrecked in the Auckland Islands.

Hudson is credited with proposing modern-day daylight saving time. His shift-work job gave him leisure time to collect insects, and led him to value after-hours daylight. In 1895, he presented a paper to the Wellington Philosophical Society proposing a two-hour daylight-saving shift, and after considerable interest was expressed in Christchurch, he followed up in an 1898 paper. In 1933, Hudson was the first recipient (together with Ernest Rutherford) of the T. K. Sidey Medal, set up by the Royal Society of New Zealand from funds collected to commemorate the passing of the Summer-Time Act 1927.

Another Briton, William Willett championed the use of daylight saving time. It was made law there in 1916.

Hudson's collection of insects, the largest in New Zealand, is housed in the Museum of New Zealand Te Papa Tongarewa. Between 1881 and 1946, Hudson recorded information in three handwritten volumes that described thousands of species, inventing his own coding system. In 2018, Te Papa launched a crowd-sourcing project calling for digital volunteers to help decipher those codes, which will then allow conservation entomologists to compare Hudson's records with the status of those same insects today.

Honours and awards
 1919 – Original Fellow of the Royal Society of New Zealand
 1923 – Hector Medal
 1929 – Hutton Medal
 1933 – T. K. Sidey Medal (together with Ernest Rutherford)

Personal life
Hudson's wife, Florence, died in 1935. They left one daughter, Florence Stella Gibbs. Hudson died on 5 April 1946 at his home "Hillview" in the Wellington suburb of Karori.

Works
1892: An Elementary Manual of New Zealand entomology: Being an introduction to the study of our native insects. London: West, Newman, & Co.
1898: New Zealand Moths and Butterflies (Macro-Lepidoptera) London: West, Newman, & Co.
1904: 
1928: 
1950:

References

External links

 G V Hudson collection at the Museum of New Zealand Te Papa Tongarewa
 Record of George Vernon Hudson in Collections Online, Museum of New Zealand Te Papa Tongarewa
 
 

1867 births
1946 deaths
New Zealand entomologists
Entomologists from London
English emigrants to New Zealand
20th-century New Zealand scientists
20th-century British scientists